The U.S. Navy League Cadet Corps (also known as the United States Naval League Cadet Corps or "NLCC") is a junior version of the United States Naval Sea Cadet Corps (NSCC) program developed for younger cadets, aged 11 through 13, under the auspices of the Navy League of the United States. The mission of the NLCC is to train cadets about the seagoing military services, community service, citizenship, and an understanding of discipline and teamwork so that they are prepared for membership in the NSCC.  While NLCC cadets can go into the NSCC when they turn 13, they may also elect to remain in the NLCC until age 14, when they must either transfer into the NSCC, or leave the program.

NLCC cadets wear US Navy uniforms with appropriate insignia denoting NLCC membership.  NSCC officers administer the program and supervise the cadets.  NLCC units are grouped with NSCC units under the supervision of regional, and senior regional directors, however, those who have achieved "Training Ship" status can operate semi-independently from their attached NSCC Units.

NLCC units that are of independent status are denoted by the title "Training Ship" (often abbreviated as "T.S.").  NLCC units who do not have enough cadets to warrant independent status ("conditions preclude the formation of a Training Ship") are attached to NSCC units as "Companies."   "T.S. Hamilton" would therefore be an independent NLCC unit but "Bantam Company" would indicate a smaller unit attached to the local NSCC unit (which can carry either a "Division," "Squadron," or "Battalion" title depending on their training orientation).

NLCC Training rotations (Orientation and Advanced Training) last for seven to nine day periods, unlike NSCC training rotations which can last for two weeks or longer.

NLCC Cadets can earn most of the same type of ribbons and awards as Sea Cadets, and can wear all earned ribbons except annual service ribbon when transferring into the NSCC program.

The rank system for cadets proceeds as follows: Recruit (LC-1), Apprentice Cadet (LC-2), Able Cadet (LC-3), Petty Officer 3rd Class (LC-4), Petty Officer 2nd Class (LC-5), Petty Officer 1st Class (LC-6), Ship's Leading Petty Officer (LC-7).  Promotions are made by time-in requirement and passing of examinations.  The minimum time in rate requirements are four months for lower rates and six months for petty officers and a 75% correct score on coursework and advancement examinations.   A cadet who has successfully completed NLCC Orientation, is advanced to NLCC petty officer third class and serves a minimum of one year of service in the NLCC will go into the NSCC at a higher grade. For the first three ranks, LC-1 through LC-3, you add additional chevrons to the uniform (E2-T).

USNLCC Ranking Chart 
The USNLCC follows the same ranking as the USNSCC, with chevrons instead of being silver than gold, in USNSCC ranks.

See also
Navy League
Sea Cadets

References

External links
Naval Sea Cadet Corps official website. Retrieved 2016-01-08.
NSCC Homeport official website. Retrieved 2016-01-08.
Naval Cadet organisations
American military youth groups